Two ships of the United States Navy have been named Bremerton, after the city of Bremerton, Washington.

 , was a heavy cruiser in use from 1945 to 1960.
 , was a Los Angeles–class nuclear attack submarine in commission from 1981 to 2021.

References
 

United States Navy ship names